The Mangrove Creek, a perennial river that is part of the Hawkesbury-Nepean catchment, is located in the Central Coast region of New South Wales, Australia.

Course and features
The river descends  over its  course.

Although called a creek, the watercourse is designated as a river, and its headwaters are impounded by the Mangrove Creek Dam, which forms a major part of the water supply to the Central Coast. Below the dam, the creek flows in a southerly direction through the settlements of Upper Mangrove, Mangrove Creek, Greengrove and Lower Mangrove, before joining the Hawkesbury River.

See also 

 List of rivers of Australia
 List of rivers of New South Wales (L–Z)
 Mangrove Creek Dam
 Popran Valley
 Rivers of New South Wales

References 

Rivers of New South Wales
Central Coast (New South Wales)
Hawkesbury River